Alpha... is the fourth studio album by French rapper Black M, which consists of three parts that were released as an Extended play through out the year of 2021.

History 
During the evening of 26 December 2020, Black M began to "clash" his co-operative from the Sexion d'Assaut, Gims as well as Kev Adams on Twitter, which put Internet users in doubt, thinking that his account had been hacked. It even caught the attention of Booba on the other side of the earth (Black M even went to his concert in 2015 at the Accor Arena and was even able to benefit from his support the following year during the controversy over his canceled concert for the celebration of the centenary of the Battle of Verdun). Indeed, the latter, who is in clash with some members of the Sexion d'Assaut such as Gims or Barack Adama, began to clash Black M in turn by saying that his "clash" was a coup de comm ' for the output of a new sound. The next day, 27 December 2020 at 12 pm, Black M releases "Black Shady, Pt. 4", on his birthday, where he traces his year 2020 in the guise of his alter-ego, which is inspired by Eminem's Slim Shady. At the same time, he announces that the first part of his fourth album Alpha... will be released in March 2021 as an Extended play. On 13 January 2021, Black M released the second single from his album entitled "À la base".

On 22 January 2021, Black M released the third single from his album titled "César" featuring Gims. This is the first feature on the album, as well as the second collaboration between the two members of the Sexion d'Assaut, 8 years after the first in "Ça décoiffe", from Gims's debut album, Subliminal. On April 2nd of 2021, Black M released the fourth single from his album entitled "N.S.E.G." (Nous Sommes En Guerre). This is a rap sound with an instrument mixed in two types with trap and drill. When the clip is released, the release date of the first part is therefore written on the customized bus with the EP cover. Alpha, Pt. 1 will be released on 21 May 2021.

On 6 May 2021, Black M unveiled the track list of part 1 of his album with his son "Mowgly". Composed of 14 tracks in addition to the feat with Gims on "César", it also features four Guinean rappers including a duo: Soulby THB and Worbhé (group made up of Sleyfa, the cousin of Black M and Zerfry, the little brother of Black M) on the title Crack, MC Freshh on the title Million still in the company of Soulby THB and again Worbhé on the title 2h in the morning. The duo Les Twins is featured on a remix of "N.S.E.G.". The next day, 7 May 2021 at midnight, Black M sends the fifth single from Alpha, Pt. 1 titled "À la Tienne" on streaming platforms. In addition, the EP is finally available for pre-order. On the night of May 20-21, 2021, Black M is organizing a live stream on his YouTube channel to do some excerpts from the project with comedian Greg Guillotin.

On 21 May 2021, upon the release of the EP, Black M released two music videos: the remix of "N.S.E.G." as a feat with Les Twins at midnight as well as the clip of "À la tienne" at 12h. On 24 July 2021, Black M unveils the clip for "Week-end".

Track listing

References

2021 albums
Black M albums